Yair Nathan (born 11 October 1970) is a Peruvian table tennis player. He competed in the men's singles event at the 1992 Summer Olympics.

References

1970 births
Living people
Peruvian male table tennis players
Olympic table tennis players of Peru
Table tennis players at the 1992 Summer Olympics
Sportspeople from Lima